Black Fingernails, Red Wine is the third studio album by Eskimo Joe, released on 10 June 2006. The album became their first number one on the Australian ARIA Albums Chart, debuting atop the chart in the week of 19 June 2006. The album was certified 4× Platinum in Australia. It is their best selling album to date. It was released as the band's debut album in the United States on 25 September 2007.

In early 2007 a special edition of the album was released featured a bonus remix EP which was originally sold at Eskimo Joe concerts during their Beating like a Drum tour.

On 10 March 2019, an anniversary edition of the album was released as a two-disc set and saw the album's release for the first time on vinyl.

Production
To record the album the band enlisted sound engineer Matt Lovell (The Mess Hall, Jebediah, Sleepy Jackson), and also took on production duties themselves for the first time.

The album is noted for being heavily influenced by the production techniques and sound of early 1980s rock, with many similarities to vintage Icehouse and INXS. This led to Tony Martin (Get This, Triple M) back-announcing their songs by calling them 'INXSkimo Joe'. Kavyen Temperley explained: "I always think of things in a concept-record type of way. So I wanted to make a record as if we were a stadium rock band" "If we were like INXS, what kind of record would I want to write?".

The band recorded Black Fingernails, Red Wine on the central coast of NSW's The Grove Studios. The Grove Studios were originally known as Mangrove Studio and were formerly owned by INXS bass player Garry Gary Beers.

Cover art
The cover art, by Brisbane artist Dane Lovett, is made up of three full separate artworks of the band members. The full pictures were used for the covers of the singles (left to right) "New York", "Black Fingernails, Red Wine" and "Sarah".

Track listing

1. "Setting Sun" was previously known as "Forever Young".

This remix EP was released with the special edition of Black Fingernails, Red Wine, to promote the Beating like a Drum tour.

Charts

Weekly charts

Year-end charts

Decade-end charts

Certifications

Release history

References

Eskimo Joe albums
2006 albums
ARIA Award-winning albums
Rykodisc albums